White Skin is a 2004 Canadian horror film directed by Daniel Roby and starring Marc Paquet and Marianne Farley. It was released on video in the United States under the title Cannibal.  The film won the award for Best Canadian First Feature Film at the 2004 Toronto International Film Festival, and the Claude Jutra Award for best feature film by a first-time director at the 25th Genie Awards.

Premise
Two men discover that one's girlfriend is a vampiric creature that needs to feed on human flesh.

Cast
Marc Paquet – Thierry Richard
Marianne Farley – Claire Lefrançois
Frédéric Pierre – Henri Dieudonné
 – Marquise Lefrançois
Jude Antoine Jarda – Eddy
Isabelle Guérard – Manon

References

External links

2004 films
Canadian vampire films
2004 horror films
2000s French-language films
Best First Feature Genie and Canadian Screen Award-winning films
Films directed by Daniel Roby
Films shot in Montreal
2004 directorial debut films
French-language Canadian films
2000s Canadian films